European Information Technologies Certification Academy (EITCA) programme is an international professional ICT knowledge and skills certification standard, developed and governed by the EITCI Institute – a non-profit organization based in Brussels, that
provides certification of individuals' knowledge and skills in broad field-oriented areas of ICT expertise such as Computer graphics, Information security etc. The EITCA programmes, referred to as EITCA Academies, include selected sets of several to over a dozen of individual EITC programmes, that together comprise a particular area of qualifications.

EITCA Academies
As of June 2015 the EITCA certification standard includes the following Academies:

See also
 EITC programme
 EITCI institute

References

External links
 EITCI Official Website
 EITCI certificate and accreditation validation page
 Certification Academy

International standards
Computer standards
Cryptography standards
Information technology qualifications
Computer security qualifications
Professional titles and certifications
EITCI certification programmes
Digital divide